Bolshoye Soldatskoye is a rural locality (a selo) and the administrative center of Bolshesoldatsky District, Kursk Oblast, Russia. Population:

Climate
Bolshoye Soldatskoye has a warm-summer humid continental climate (Dfb in the Köppen climate classification).

References

Notes

Sources

Rural localities in Kursk Oblast